Thomas Michael Frederick (born August 6, 1972) is a former American football defensive end. He played college football at Virginia. He was drafted in the 3rd round (94th overall) of the 1995 NFL draft by the Cleveland Browns.

Professional career
Fredrick was selected in the 3rd round (94th overall) of the 1995 NFL draft by the Cleveland Browns.

As a rookie, he appeared in 16 games recording 1.5 sacks. In 1996, following the Cleveland Browns relocation controversy and the forming of the Baltimore Ravens, Frederick became a starter for the Ravens at left defensive end where he started 11 games. He remained with the Ravens until 1998 as a back-up. On February 16, 1999 he signed with the New York Jets as an unrestricted free agent. On August 30, 1999 he was released by the Jets. Less than a week later on September 5 he was signed by the Tennessee Titans. While with the Titans, he appeared in 13 games and recorded a half sack. The following offseason, on July 23, 2000 he was signed by the Philadelphia Eagles. On August 27, 2000 he was released by the Eagles.

References

1972 births
Living people
American football defensive ends
Baltimore Ravens players
Cleveland Browns players
New York Jets players
People from Abington Township, Montgomery County, Pennsylvania
Philadelphia Eagles players
Players of American football from Pennsylvania
Sportspeople from Montgomery County, Pennsylvania
Tennessee Titans players
Virginia Cavaliers football players